Khan al-Arous (The Bride Khan) is a small khan in Al-Qutayfah, Rif Dimashq Governorate, Syria

See also
Khan As'ad Pasha
Khan Jaqmaq
Khan Sulayman Pasha
Khan Tuman

References

Caravanserais in Damascus